Euphaedra temeraria is a butterfly in the family Nymphalidae. It is found in Equatorial Guinea and Gabon.

References

Butterflies described in 2007
temeraria